

Seeds

All SEC schools played in the tournament.  Teams were seeded by their 2010–11 SEC season record, with a tiebreaker system to seed teams with identical conference records. Unlike men's basketball play, SEC women's play is not conducted in a divisional format; all 12 teams are organized in a single table. The top four teams on the regular-season table received byes.

Schedule

2011 SEC tournament

SEC women's basketball tournament
Tournament
SEC
Basketball competitions in Nashville, Tennessee
Women's sports in Tennessee
College sports tournaments in Tennessee
2011 in sports in Tennessee